The William E. Colby Military Writers' Award was established in 1999 by the William E. Colby Military Writers' Symposium at Norwich University in Vermont in order to recognize "a first work of fiction or non-fiction that has made a major contribution to the understanding of intelligence operations, military history, or international affairs." It is named in honor of William Egan Colby. As of 2021, Alex Kershaw is the chair of its selection committee.

The Colby Circle was co-founded by writers Carlo D'Este and W.E.B. Griffin. The award honorarium is currently administered by the Tawani Foundation in Chicago, and presented at the annual William E. Colby Military Writers' Symposium hosted by Norwich University.

Recipients
2022 Wesley Morgan, The Hardest Place: The American Military Adrift in Afghanistan's Pech Valley
2021 Mark Treanor, A Quiet Cadence: A Novel
2020 Adam Higginbotham, Midnight in Chernobyl: The Untold Story of the World’s Greatest Nuclear Disaster
2019 Paul Scharre, Army of None,
2018 Steven E. Sodergren, The Army of the Potomac in the Overland & Petersburg Campaigns,
2017 David J. Barron, Waging War: The Clash Between Presidents and Congress, 1776 to ISIS,
2016 Nisid Hajari, Midnight's Furies: The Deadly Legacy of India’s Partition,
2015 Douglas V. Mastriano, Alvin York: A New Biography of the Hero of the Argonne,
2014 Logan Beirne,  Blood of Tyrants: George Washington and the Forging of the Presidency,
2013 Thomas P. McKenna,  Kontum: The Battle to Save South Vietnam,
 2012 Michael Franzak, A Nightmare's Prayer
 2011 Karl Marlantes, Matterhorn: A Novel of the Vietnam War
 2010 Jack H. Jacobs, If Not Now, When?
 2009 Dexter Filkins, The Forever War, and Marcus Luttrell, Lone Survivor
 2008 R. Alan King, Twice Armed: An American Soldier's Battle for the Hearts and Minds in Iraq
 2007 John Glusman, Conduct Under Fire, and Ian W. Toll, Six Frigates
 2006 Nathaniel Fick One Bullet Away, and Kevin Weddle, Lincoln's Tragic Admiral
 2005 Sidney Shachnow and Jann Robbins Hope and Honor, and 2005 Jon Meacham Franklin and Winston
 2004 Bing West and Major General Ray L. Smith The March Up, and Robert L. Bateman's No Gun Ri: A Military History of the Korean War Incident
 2003 Bryan Mark Rigg Hitler's Jewish Soldiers
 2002 Patrick K. O'Donnell Beyond Valor, and Ralph Wetterhahn The Last Battle
 2001 James Bradley with Ron Powers Flags of Our Fathers
 2000 B.G. Burkett and Glenna Whitley Stolen Valor
 1999 Fred Chiaventone A Road We Do Not Know, and Bill Harlow Circle William

References

External links
 William E. Colby Award, official website

American literary awards
First book awards
Awards established in 1999
Military literary awards
1999 establishments in England